Mud Lake may refer to several places:

Cities, towns, townships
 Mud Lake, Idaho
 Mud Lake, Minnesota
 Mud Lake, Newfoundland and Labrador, Canada
 Mud Lake, Ontario, Canada

Lakes

Canada
 Mud Lake (Alberta), several
 Mud Lake (British Columbia), several
 Mud Lake (Ontario), more than seventy lakes
 Mud Lake (Saskatchewan), several

U.S.
 Mud Lake (Alabama)
 Mud Lake (Alaska), several
 Mud Lake (Arizona), several
 Mud Lake (Arkansas), over a dozen Mud Lakes in this state
 Mud Lake (California), over 30 Mud Lakes in this state
 Mud Lake (Colorado), several
 Mud Lake (Florida), over a dozen Mud Lakes in this state
 Mud Lake (Georgia), several
 Mud Lake (Idaho), several
 Mud Lake (Illinois), several
 Mud Lake (Indiana), over a dozen Mud Lakes in this state
 Mud Lake (Iowa), several
 Mud Lake (Kentucky), several
 Mud Lake (Louisiana), over a dozen Mud Lakes in this state
 Mud Lake (Maine), several
 Mud Lake (Michigan), over 150 Mud Lakes in this state
 Mud Lake (Minnesota), over 150 Mud Lakes in this state
 Mud Lake (Mississippi), several
 Mud Lake (Missouri), several
 Mud Lake (Montana), over a dozen Mud Lakes in this state
 Mud Lake (Nebraska), several
 Mud Lake (Nevada), several
 Mud Lake (New Mexico)
 Mud Lake (New York), over 30 Mud Lakes in this state
 Mud Lake (North Dakota), several
 Mud Lake (Ohio), several
 Mud Lake (Oregon), over a dozen Mud Lakes in this state
 Mud Lake (Pennsylvania), several
 Mud Lake (South Dakota), over a dozen Mud Lakes in this state
 Mud Lake (Tennessee)
 Mud Lake (Texas), over a dozen Mud Lakes in this state
 Mud Lake (Utah), several
 Mud Lake (Washington), over 30 Mud Lakes in this state
 Mud Lake (Wisconsin), over 150 Mud Lakes in this state
 Mud Lake (Wyoming), over a dozen Mud Lakes in this state

See also
Mud Creek (disambiguation)
Mud Lake Canal, a prehistoric canal in the Everglades National Park